Guido Behling (born 20 January 1964 in Wittenberge/Prignitz) is an East German sprint canoer who competed in the mid to late 1980s. He won three medals at the ICF Canoe Sprint World Championships with two silvers (K-2 500 m: 1985, K-4 1000 m: 1986) and a bronze (K-4 1000 m: 1989).

Behling also finished fifth in the K-2 1000 m event at the 1988 Summer Olympics in Seoul.

References

Sports-reference.com profile

1964 births
Living people
People from Wittenberge
Canoeists at the 1988 Summer Olympics
German male canoeists
Olympic canoeists of East Germany
ICF Canoe Sprint World Championships medalists in kayak
Sportspeople from Brandenburg